Morimond Abbey is a religious complex  in   Parnoy-en-Bassigny, Haute-Marne department, in the Champagne-Ardenne region of France. It was the fourth of the four great daughter abbeys of Cîteaux Abbey, of primary importance in the spread of the Cistercian Order, along with La Ferté to the south, Pontigny to the west and Clairvaux to the north.

History
Situated in the diocese of Langres, Morimond was founded in 1115 by Count Odelric of Aigremont and his wife Adeline of Choiseul and settled from Citeaux. The first abbot, known as a "pillar of the Cistercians", was Arnold the German. Thanks to his energy and influence, Morimond grew very rapidly, and established numerous colonies in France, Germany, Poland, Bohemia, Spain, and Cyprus. The only daughter-house in England and Wales was Dore Abbey, founded in 1147. Amongst the best-known were Ebrach Abbey in Germany (1126); Heiligenkreuz Abbey in Austria (1134); and Aiguebelle Abbey in France (1137), which was later restored by the Reformed Cistercians. Over the next two centuries Morimond continued to be active in the foundation of new Cistercian houses, so much so that towards the end of the 18th century, Morimond counted amongst its filiations nearly seven hundred monasteries and nunneries.

Briefs from various popes placed the principal Military Orders of Spain under the spiritual jurisdiction of the Abbot of Morimond: the Order of Calatrava (1187); the Order of Alcantara (1214); the Order of Christ in Portugal (1319), and later on, those of the Orders of St. Maurice and St. Lazarus in Savoy.

The name "Morimond" is from the Latin "mori mundo", or "Die to the world": all who entered these Cistercian abbeys in the 12th century renounced worldly life. One of the famous men who passed through Morimond was Otto of Freising, son of Margrave Leopold III of Austria and his spouse Agnes, daughter of Emperor Henry IV. He studied in Paris and then entered the abbey, of which he became abbot. Pope Benedict XII, third of the Avignon popes (1334–1342), also began his career as a monk in Morimond.

The cruciform abbey church with three aisles and closed choir, the sides of which are occupied by chapels linked by a gangway, was built to be restrained and severe, according to the Cistercian building prescriptions, without towers or artistic adornment. In 1572, during the Wars of Religion, and again in 1636 in the Thirty Years' War, Morimond was destroyed; it was abandoned in 1791 in the French Revolution. Only the church survived, but fell into ruin during the 19th century.

Remains

Today, of the medieval structures, only a fragment of the north aisle is still standing, although there remain from the 18th century the gateway, the library and some pavilions and arcades.

See also
Morimondo Abbey

References

Cistercian monasteries in France
1115 establishments in Europe
1110s establishments in France
Religious organizations established in the 1110s
Buildings and structures in Haute-Marne
Christian monasteries established in the 12th century
Ruins in Grand Est
Tourist attractions in Haute-Marne